Government Muslim High School is a government secondary boys-only school in the court hill area of Kotwali Thana, Chittagong, Bangladesh.It is one of the best schools of Chittagong.  The school's enrollment is currently 2,501 students.

History 
Chittagong Government Madrasah's Anglo-Persian Department was split off to form the school in 1909. Originally it operated out of part of the local Registration Office building. The school opened at first with madrasah and Bengali departments. The first headmaster, from 1910 to 1915, was Khan Shaheb Wahaidun Nabi. It moved to a permanent site in 1916, and was renamed Chittagong Government Muslim High School. In 1953, the Urdu department was also established.  In 1970 the school expanded into a new building.  There was also a small mosque, which was subsequently enlarged.  In 2005 the government established another two buildings, a science lab building and an administration building.

Facilitates

The school also has a hostel and headmaster's cottage. In front of the school building, there is a large playground. The school has a library which contains more than 2000 books.

The school is highly developed in terms of co-curricular activities.

There is an active debating club called GMHSDS

There is a well-equipped BNCC platoon.

There are also Scouting opportunities along with Red Crescent Youth Govt Muslim High School Unit.

There is also an active football club, which is very famous in the whole of Chittagong;

Among them, the football club of '21 batch students called Muslimian FC is famous as it was unbeatable among all the secondary school and college football clubs of Chittagong.

Notable alumni

 Ayub Bachchu, Bengali musician
 Rezaul Karim Chowdhury, Bangladeshi Politician and Mayor of Chittagong
 Piplu Khan, (b. ?)  Bangladeshi filmmaker
 Hasan Mahmud, Bangladesh Minister of Information
 Sarwar Jahan Nizam, former Navy chief Vice Admiral
 A J M Nasir Uddin, Bangladeshi Politician, former Mayor of Chittagong and Vice President of Bangladesh Cricket Board

Sport
In 1953 the school's team became the football champion in Bangladesh (then East Pakistan). In 1996 the school became the hockey champion in Bangladesh.

References

High schools in Bangladesh
1909 establishments in India
Educational institutions established in 1909
Schools in Chittagong
Public schools in Chittagong